Las Gaviotas Airport  is an airport serving the agricultural village of Las Gaviotas, in the Vichada Department of Colombia.

See also

Transport in Colombia
List of airports in Colombia

References

External links
OpenStreetMap - Las Gaviotas
OurAirports - Las Gaviotas
FallingRain - Las Gaviotas

Airports in Colombia